The Horrific Sufferings of the Mind-Reading Monster Hercules Barefoot is a 2002 novel by Swedish author Carl-Johan Vallgren. It won the August Prize in 2002.

References

2002 Swedish novels
Swedish-language novels
August Prize-winning works